Zuzana "Susanna" Martinková (born 19 April 1946) is a Czech actress, mainly active in Italy.

Born in Prague, Martinkova debuted at 16 as lead actress in Letos v zari (1963).  After several film and stage appearances, in 1967 she moved to Italy to star in a war film directed by Carlo Lizzani, Sagapò, which eventually was cancelled.  Later Martinkova starred in a number of films and television works, sometimes in main roles. She is now a winemaker.

Partial filmography 
 Letos v zari (1963) - Hanka Zemanová
 Strakatí andelé (1965) - Marie (segment "Jana")
 Kdyby tisíc klarinetu (1965) - Teacher #2
 Dva tygři (1966) - Jitka
 Who Wants to Kill Jessie? (1966) - Alena
 Granada, addio! (1967) - Paoletta 
 Per 100.000 dollari ti ammazzo (1968) - Mary
 May God Forgive You... But I Won't (1968) - Jane, Cjamango's sister (uncredited)
 Il ragazzo che sorride (1969) - Livia - Wife of Giorgio
 El 'Che' Guevara (1969) - Simona
 Detective Belli (1969) - Emmanuelle
 Taste of Vengeance (1969) - Brian's Bride (uncredited)
 The Syndicate: A Death in the Family (1970) - Fanny, la cieca
 La ragazza del prete (1970) - Erika
 Tajemství velikeho vypravece (1972)
 Prete, fai un miracolo (1975) - Isabel
 La principessa sul pisello (1976)
 Contronatura (1976)
 Il signor Ministro li pretese tutti e subito (1977) - Piera
 Il ladrone (1980) - Marta
 Notturno (1983) - Magdalena Rudinski
 Fracchia contro Dracula (1985) - Catarina
 Distant Lights (1988) - Silvia Bernardi
 Il ritorno del grande amico (1990)
 Frivolous Lola (1998) - Michelle
 Rivers of Babylon (1998) - Erzika

References

External links 
 

Living people
Czech film actresses
Czech stage actresses
Czech television actresses
Actresses from Prague
1946 births
Czech winemakers
Czech expatriates in Italy